Dave Jareckie (born July 25, 1967) is an American biathlete. He competed in the men's sprint event at the 1994 Winter Olympics.

References

External links
 

1967 births
Living people
American male biathletes
Olympic biathletes of the United States
Biathletes at the 1994 Winter Olympics
Sportspeople from Mexico City